Tixméhuac Municipality (Yucatec Maya: "Place of Xmeuac tribe") is one of the 106 municipalities in the Mexican state of Yucatán containing (251.65 km2) of land and is located roughly  southeast of the city of Mérida.

History
There is no accurate data on when the town was founded, but it was a settlement before the conquest and under the chieftainship of Tutul Xiu. After colonization, the area became part of the encomienda system with various encomenderos, including: Juan Xiu, in 1557; Hernando Xiu, in 1565; and Pablo Cen, in 1579.

Yucatán declared its independence from the Spanish Crown in 1821, and in 1825 the area was assigned to the Tekax Municipality. In 1900 it becomes its own municipality.

Governance
The municipal president is elected for a three-year term. The town council has four councilpersons, who serve as Secretary and councilors of public works, public services and cemeteries.

Communities
The head of the municipality is Tixméhuac, Yucatán. The municipality has 25 populated places besides the seat including Chican, Chuchub, Dzutóh, Ebtún, Kimbilá, Sabacché, Sisbic and Xeo-pil. The significant populations are shown below:

Local festivals
Every year on 19 September the town celebrates the feast of Saint Michael the Archangel.

Tourist attractions
 Church of Saint Michael the Archangel, built during the eighteenth century
 archeological sites at Chucub, Kimbilá, Modzil and Nocas

References

Municipalities of Yucatán